46 Ceti is a single star in the equatorial constellation of Cetus. It is visible to the naked eye with an apparent visual magnitude of 4.9.

The suffix notation CN0.5 indicates a mild overabundance of cyanogen in the stellar atmosphere. It has 1.38 times the mass of the Sun and has expanded to 19 times the Sun's radius. The star is radiating 132 times the Sun's luminosity from its enlarged photosphere at an effective temperature of 4,316 K. The projected rotational velocity is too small to be measured.

References

K-type giants
Cetus (constellation)
Durchmusterung objects
Ceti, 46
008705
006670
0412